SK was an American-made air-search radar used during World War II by the United States Navy. Models include SK-1, SK-2 and SK-3.

Overview 
Long wave search set for large ships. Furnishes range and bearing of surface vessels and aircraft, and can be used for control of interception. Set has both "A" and PPI scopes, provisions for operating with remote PPI's and for IFF connections, and built-in BL and BI antennas.

Range accuracy is ± . Azimuth accuracy, ± 3°. There is no elevation control, but elevation can be estimated roughly from positions of maximum, and minimum signal strength. 

Shipment includes spares, with tubes for 400 hours, and separate generator if ship's power is DC. Not air transportable.

Antenna measures  x . Antenna should be  or more above water. Minimum operators required are one per shift. Primary power required is 3500 kilowatts, 115 volts, 60 Hz. Source of power is ship's power of 115 volts, 60 Hz.

During the later stages of the war, a parabolic antenna called SK-2 would then replace the SK-1.

On board ships

United States 
 
 
 
 USS Enterprise (CV-6)
 USS Saratoga (CV-3)
 
 
 
 South Dakota-class battleship
 
 
 
 USS Pennsylvania (BB-38)
 
 
 USS Arkansas (BB-33)
 
 
 
 
 USS Wichita (CA-45)

United Kingdom 
 
 HMS Boxer (F121)

Gallery

See also 

 List of radars
 Radar configurations and types
 Air-search radar

Citations

References 

 Norman Friedman (2006). The Naval Institute Guide to World Naval Weapon Systems.  Naval Institute Press.  
 Buderi, Robert (1998). The Invention That Changed the World: How a Small Group of Radar Pioneers Won the Second World War and Launched a Technical Revolution. Touchstone. 
 Hezlet, Arthur (1975). Electronics and Sea Power. New York: Stein and Day. 

Naval radars
World War II radars
Military equipment introduced from 1940 to 1944
Military radars of the United States